Joseph-Pierre Turcotte (May 21, 1857 – January 6, 1939) was a lawyer, journalist and political figure in Quebec. He represented Quebec County in the House of Commons of Canada from 1908 to 1911 as a Liberal.

He was born in Saint-Jean, Île d'Orléans, Canada East, the son of François-Xavier Turcotte and Élisabeth Rousseau. Turcotte was admitted to the Quebec bar in 1881 and practised in Quebec City. He was an unsuccessful candidate for a seat in the Quebec assembly in 1886 and 1896. He contributed to a number of publications including the Petit Journal, the Revue de Québec and the Électeur. In 1910, he was named King's Counsel.

Electoral record 

By-election: On Mr. Pelletier being appointed Postmaster General, 10 October 1911

References 

Members of the House of Commons of Canada from Quebec
Liberal Party of Canada MPs
1857 births
1939 deaths
Canadian King's Counsel